Oye bonita (Hey Beautiful) is a Colombian telenovela produced by Colombiana de Televisión for Caracol Televisión. It was directed by Williams Gonzalez and Katalina Hernandez. Oye bonita had good ratings during its airing.

Oye bonita stars Karoll Márquez and Diana Hoyos in the lead roles; Nicolás Nocetti and Alejandro Palacio (in his acting debut) feature among the cast. The story is musicalized with the vallenato musical genre and its main theme revolves around disgruntled love.

Synopsis 
The story mainly revolves around Monchi Maestri, an aspiring musician in his 20s, loosely written after Diomedes Diaz, minus the negative events of his life. He lives in the El Carrizal town and falls in love with Diana Lacouture despite their families having a conflicted background.  Monchi's family, the Maestres, was exiled from its home due to the influence of the Isazas, a powerful family in the Caribbean region of Colombia, and of a close associate and Diana's father, Antoine Lacouture, who regrets having taken the lands of the Maestres.

Monchi and Diana Lacouture fall in love, only for it to be revealed that Diana was to be engaged to Fito (Nicolás Nocetti), an ambitious Argentinian who seeks to marry her for his own obscure intentions.

Production 
Oye bonita was produced by Colombiana de TV. Preproduction lasted five years. Shooting began on July 14, 2008 and ended on November 20, 2009. The show's premiere was on October 27, 2008.

The script for Oye bonita was written by Arleth Castillo.

The main location of the telenovela was Girardot, though other locations in Tolima and Caribbean region were also used.

Cast 
 Karoll Márquez - Ramón Segundo "Monchi" Maestre Urbina
 Diana Hoyos - Diana Lacouture Murgas "La Bonita"
 Félix Antequera - Ramón "Moncho" Maestre
 Patricia Ércole - Elvia Urbina de Maestre
 Maribel Abello - Josefa Murgas
 Alejandro Palacio - Manuel "El Duro" Isaza
 Eileen Moreno - Macarena Maestre Urbina / "Clara Inés"
 Ana María Estupiñán - Chiquinquirá Maestre Urbina
 Lorena Álvarez - Carmen Maestre Urbina
 Margoth Velásquez - Mama Petra
 Eileen Roca - La Nena
 Beto Villa Jr - Elías
 Nicolás Nocetti - Fito Pérez
 Diego Camacho Fallon- The Turkish Guy
 Diana Santamaria - Zunilda

Music 
The main song of Oye Bonita, is the eponymous work interpreted by Karoll Márquez.

Awards and nominations 

Oye bonita received nominations for the TVyNovelas Awards Colombia.

Tv y Novelas awards Colombia

India Catalina Awards

References 

2008 Colombian television series debuts
2009 Colombian television series endings
Caracol Televisión telenovelas